Jim Boyd was a weekend, early morning and midday news anchor and reporter for WCVB-TV. He is currently working as an actor in major motion pictures and television productions.

Early life and education

Born James Lloyd Boyd in Harlem, New York, he is the son of Edmonia Coleman, a secretary and receptionist and Leroy Homer Boyd, a postal worker, gospel singer and musician. His grandfather Arthur Leroy Boyd was first violinist in the Negro String Quartet that performed with singer Roland Hayes at New York's Carnegie Hall on November 27, 1925. Boyd had three siblings. He was born in Harlem Hospital, educated in New York City Schools (Public School 90, and Public School 68, Humboldt Junior High School 115 and George Washington High School (New York City) (class of 1958) and attended Long Island University in Brooklyn, New York and Fairleigh Dickinson University in Teaneck, New Jersey.

Career

Boyd started his broadcasting career at National Educational Television in New York in 1961, beginning as a mail clerk, then production assistant, associate producer and eventually producer for News In Perspective a bi-weekly news analysis and background program produced in association with The New York Times and hosted by Lester Markel and Clifton Daniel. The program was generally produced in New York City and Washington, DC, but often was produced around the world including Osaka, Japan; Saigon, South Vietnam; Cairo, Egypt; Bonn, Germany; or Paris, France. Boyd began an on-air career in Boston, Mass. in the 1970s as a general assignment reporter at WCVB-TV. He co-anchored weekend newscasts from 1976 to 1984, early mornings from 1984 to 2000 and noontime newscasts from 1984 to 2006 when he was named special correspondent and field reporter for both WCVB's broadcast news operation and its website TheBostonChannel.com (now WCVB.com). He retired at the end of 2008. In 2009 Boyd enrolled as an undergraduate at University of Massachusetts Boston, transferred to Tufts University in Medford, Mass. and graduated with a Bachelor of Arts degree in Sociology in 2013. Throughout his television career Boyd had been a member of AFTRA (The American federation of Television and Radio Artists) that merged with the Screen Actors Guild in 2012 to become SAG-AFTRA. In 2013 after graduating from Tufts, Boyd began acting in television series and motion pictures as an extra or background performer. Projects to date include: American Hustle, The Equalizer, The Judge, The Forger, Olive Kitteridge, Unfinished Business, Black Mass, Ted 2, and Spotlight.

Awards

Boyd received a Golden Circle award from the National Academy of Television Arts and Sciences New England chapter in 2011 and was inducted into the Massachusetts Broadcasters Hall of Fame in 2012.

Charitable and Community Work

Boyd has done volunteer work with or served on the boards of the YMCA in Roxbury, Mass; Youth Enrichment Services (YES) in Boston, Mass; The Arthritis Foundation in Boston, Mass; and The Massachusetts Chapter of the Huntington's Disease Society of America. He participates in the Screen Actors Guild Foundation Book Pals program and has been a volunteer parent/coach in the Needham Track Club, the Needham Soccer Club, St. Joseph's Parish Youth Basketball program in Needham, Mass and the Bay State Jaguars AAU Basketball program in Newton, Mass.

References

External links

American television reporters and correspondents
Television anchors from Boston
1942 births
Living people
Long Island University alumni
Fairleigh Dickinson University alumni
George Washington Educational Campus alumni
Tufts University School of Arts and Sciences alumni